Christo Popov (born 8 March 2002) is a French badminton player who affiliate with Fos club. He was the boys' doubles European U15 and U17 Junior Champions, also won the boys' singles silver medals at the 2018 European and 2019 World Junior Championships. He reached a career high as boys' singles World Junior number 1 in January 2020. He then clinched the boys' singles title at the 2020 European Junior Championships.

Personal life 
Christo Popov was born in Sofia, Bulgaria. He comes from a family featuring other professional badminton players. His father, Thomas, played for and coached the Bulgarian national team; his mother, Tzvetomira, was a national badminton referee; and his older brother, Toma Junior Popov, was a 2017 European Junior Champion.

Career 
Christo Popov started playing badminton at the age of 5. He won the European U15 and U17 Junior Champions in the boys' doubles event with Kenji Lovang in 2016 and 2017 respectively, also finished as boys' singles U15 runner-up in 2016. He later won the boys' singles silver medals at the 2018 European and 2019 World Junior Championships. He managed to win the 2017 Italian Junior International, Danish Junior Cup, also 2018 and 2019 Hungarian Junior International.

At the age of 16, he already won the senior international tournament at the 2018 Bulgarian Open in the men's doubles event with his brother Toma Junior Popov. Christo Popov topped the boys' singles World Junior Ranking on 7 January 2020. He won the men's singles in the 2020 French national championships and in doing so became the youngest ever winner of the competition  At the 2020 European Men's and Women's Team Badminton Championships he won the bronze medal with the French national team. In March 2020, he claimed his first BWF Junior International Grand Prix title by winning the Dutch Junior tournament. At the 2020 European Junior Championships in Lahti, Finland, Popov claimed three medals, winning a gold in the boys' singles, a silver in the team, and a bronze in the mixed doubles events.

In 2021, Popov opened the season by participating at the European Mixed Team Championships together with the French national team. The team finished as the finalist and won the silver medal. In May, he received the BEC Young Player of the Year and European Fan Player of the Yeat by the Badminton Europe. At the 2021 Spain Masters, he finished as a men's doubles semi-finalist.

Achievements

BWF World Junior Championships 
Boys' singles

European Junior Championships 
Boys' singles

Mixed doubles

BWF International Challenge/Series (4 titles, 2 runners-up)
Men's singles

Men's doubles

  BWF International Challenge tournament
  BWF International Series tournament
  BWF Future Series tournament

BWF Junior International (5 titles, 4 runners-up) 
Boys' singles

  BWF Junior International Grand Prix tournament
  BWF Junior International Challenge tournament
  BWF Junior International Series tournament
  BWF Junior Future Series tournament

References

External links 
 
 

2002 births
Living people
Sportspeople from Sofia
Bulgarian emigrants to France
French male badminton players